Children's programming has played a part in Telemundo's programming since its initial roots in television. This article outlines the history of children's television programming on Telemundo including the various blocks and notable programs that have aired throughout the television network's history.

History 
For much of its history, the bulk of NetSpan/Telemundo's children's programming has been derived of mainly live-action and animated programming from American and international producers, including Spanish-language dubs of programs produced in other languages, and Spanish-language programming acquired from other countries.

Telemuñequitos (1992–1998) 
On June 1, 1992, the network's first foray into children's programming, Telemuñequitos, was in partnership with Warner Bros., and featured Spanish-language dubs of Warner Bros. Cartoons productions (including Looney Tunes, Merrie Melodies and Popeye the Sailor). The network converted its children’s programming every weekday mornings until 2000.

Telemundo Infantil (1995–1998)  
In September 1995, Telemundo launched a Saturday morning block, Telemundo Infantil ("Telemundo Kids"), which was developed via input from viewers on what they wanted to be featured in a children's show. Which borrowed its the block originally in Puerto Rico aired on Telemundo Puerto Rico, included the weekdays afternoon and weekend morning line-up that consisted mainly of dubbed versions of American, Canadian, and European (including Animaniacs, Inspector Gadget, The Magic School Bus, Extreme Ghostbusters, Mona the Vampire, Tiny Toon Adventures and Bobby's World) as well as anime series (such as Dragon Ball Z, The Wonderful Wizard of OZ, Pokémon, Slam Dunk and Yu-Gi-Oh!).

Nickelodeon en Telemundo (1998–2001) 

On September 15, 1998, Telemundo introduced Nickelodeon en Telemundo, a block featuring Spanish dubs of the joint agreement with Nickelodeon programming, which debuted on November 9, 1998 and was considered a sub-block of Telemundo Infantil, consisted of Spanish dubs of Nickelodeon's animated series aimed at older children and preschool-oriented programs aired by the channel's Nick Jr. block (such as Rugrats, Doug, Aaahh!!! Real Monsters, Hey Arnold!, Rocko's Modern Life, Blue's Clues and Dora the Explorer). The block ran on weekday mornings until September 5, 2000, when it was relegated to Saturday and Sunday mornings in order to accommodate a time slot for Hoy En El Mundo (with Jose Diaz-Balart).

Telemundo Kids (2001–2006) 

The Nickelodeon blocks were discontinued after September 30, 2001, ahead of the expiry of Telemundo's program supply deal with Nickelodeon. It was then replaced with Telemundo Kids debut on October 6, 2001, which featured a mix of acquired programming from various providers, including Sony Pictures Television (such as Men in Black: The Series, Dragon Tales, Jackie Chan Adventures and Max Steel) and later Nickelodeon (Rugrats, Hey Arnold!, Dora the Explorer and All Grown Up!).

Following the sale of Telemundo to NBC in 2001 and the CBS/Viacom (now Paramount Global) split in early 2006, the block was discontinued September 3, 2006. However, Jacob Two-Two carried over to the block’s direct successor Qubo, which premiered the following week.

Qubo on NBC/Telemundo (2006–2012) 
In September 2006, Telemundo debuted Qubo, a new weekend morning block of educational programming formed as a joint venture between NBC Universal, Ion Media Networks, Corus Entertainment, Scholastic, and Classic Media subsidiary Big Idea Entertainment. The block carried Spanish-language dubs of programming acquired or produced for Qubo's English-language blocks on NBC and Ion,  airing on Saturday and Sunday mornings in 90-minute blocks.

The reasoning why the name "qubo" was chosen for the endeavor, or why its logo is a cube, has not been publicly explained by any of the partners, although general manager Rick Rodriguez stated in an interview with Multichannel News that the name was intended to be something that sounded fun, and be a brand that could easily be uniformally used in English and Spanish.

MiTelemundo (NBC Kids) (2012–2017) 
On July 7, 2012, after the acquisition of NBC Universal by Comcast, the block was replaced by MiTelemundo; programmed by Sprout, it consisted of Spanish dubbed versions of programs seen on its sister broadcast network's Saturday morning block, NBC Kids, which debuted on the same date.

MiTelemundo debuted on July 7, 2012, one week after the Qubo block ended its run on both NBC and Telemundo on June 30 (which left Ion Television (and later Ion Plus) as the only network to retain a Qubo-branded children's block up until the closure of the Qubo Channel on February 28, 2021, as the E.W. Scripps Company is now the owner of Ion Media, which they acquired on January 7, 2021).

MiTelemundo (Litton Entertainment) (2018–present) 
With NBC Kids being replaced with Litton Entertainment's The More You Know block on NBC by September 25, 2016, MiTelemundo initially retained its existing programming until January 6, 2018, when MiTelemundo moved exclusively to Saturday mornings and became programmed by Litton. The relaunched MiTelemundo carries Spanish dubs of programming from The More You Know.

Named after NBC's series of public service campaigns, the three-hour Saturday morning block is programmed by Litton Entertainment, and features live-action programming aimed at teens, all of which is dubbed in Spanish. Despite the change of programming, it did not change the name of the block, which remains as MiTelemundo.

Programming

Schedule issues
Due to regulations defined by the Children's Television Act that require stations to carry E/I compliant programming for three hours each week at any time between 7:00 a.m. and 10:00 a.m. local time, some Telemundo stations may defer certain programs aired within its Saturday morning block to Sunday daytime or earlier Saturday morning slots, or (in the case of affiliates in the Western United States) Saturday afternoons as makegoods to comply with the CTA regulations.

List of notable programs

Telemuñequitos

Telemundo Infantil

Nickelodeon en Telemundo

Telemundo Kids

Qubo en Telemundo

MiTelemundo (NBC Kids)

MiTelemundo (Litton Entertainment)

References 

Telemundo